ATOM Deweloper Posciellux.pl Wrocław is a Polish-based women's road cycling team that was founded in 2016, before joining the UCI in 2022.

Major results
2019
Stage 5 Tour de Feminin, Katarzyna Wilkos
Kievskaya Sotka Women Challenge, Katarzyna Wilkos

2021
 Overall Belgrade GP Woman Tour, Agnieszka Skalniak-Sójka
Stage 1b, Agnieszka Skalniak-Sójka
Stage 2, Dominika Wlodarcyzk
 Overall Gracia–Orlová, Agnieszka Skalniak-Sójka
 Points classification, Agnieszka Skalniak-Sójka
Stages 1, 3b & 4, Agnieszka Skalniak-Sójka

2022
 Overall Gracia Orlová, Agnieszka Skalniak-Sójka
 Points classification, Agnieszka Skalniak-Sójka
Stages 1, 3b & 4, Agnieszka Skalniak-Sójka
 Overall Belgium Tour, Agnieszka Skalniak-Sójka
Prologue, Agnieszka Skalniak-Sójka
  Overall Princess Anna Vasa Tour, Agnieszka Skalniak-Sójka
 Points classification, Agnieszka Skalniak-Sójka
Stages 1, 2 & 3, Agnieszka Skalniak-Sójka
 Ladies Tour of Estonia, Agnieszka Skalniak-Sójka
Districtenpijl - Ekeren-Deurne, Daria Pikulik
 Overall Giro Toscana Int. Femminile – Memorial Michela Fanini, Agnieszka Skalniak-Sójka
 Points classification, Agnieszka Skalniak-Sójka
Prologue, Agnieszka Skalniak-Sójka
Stage 4, Dominika Włodarczyk

National champions
2017
 Poland U23 Cyclocross, Patrycja Lorkowska

2018
 Poland Track (Individual pursuit), Justyna Kaczkowska
 Poland Track (Scratch race), Łucja Pietrzak

2019
 Poland Road Race, Łucja Pietrzak
 Poland Track (Individual pursuit), Justyna Kaczkowska

2022
 Poland Cyclocross, Dominika Włodarczyk
 Poland Time Trial, Agnieszka Skalniak-Sójka
 Poland Road Race, Wiktoria Pikulik

References

Cycling teams based in Poland
Cycling teams established in 2016